HMS Hereward, named after Hereward the Wake, was an H-class destroyer built for the Royal Navy in the mid-1930s. She was assigned to the Mediterranean Fleet before  and the ship spent four months during the Spanish Civil War in mid-1937 in Spanish waters, enforcing the arms blockade imposed by Britain and France on both sides of the conflict. When the Second World War began in September 1939, the ship was in the Mediterranean, but was shortly transferred to the South Atlantic to hunt for German commerce raiders and blockade runners, capturing one of the latter in November. Hereward was transferred to the Home Fleet in May 1940 and rescued Queen Wilhelmina of the Netherlands after the Germans had invaded.

The ship was transferred back to the Mediterranean Fleet later that month, and escorted convoys to Malta as well as escorting the larger ships of the fleet. She sank an Italian submarine in December before sinking the Italian torpedo boat  the following month. Hereward participated in the Battle of Cape Matapan in March 1941 and helped to evacuate Allied troops from Greece in April. In May the ship sank several small ships of a German convoy attempting to land troops on Crete. Later that month, she was bombed and sunk by German dive bombers as she was evacuating Allied troops from Crete. Her survivors and a number of evacuees were rescued by Italian vessels and they became prisoners of war.

Description
Steam for the turbines was provided by three Admiralty 3-drum water-tube boilers. The ship's complement was 137 officers and men in peacetime, but this increased to 146 in wartime.

The ship mounted four 45-calibre 4.7-inch (120 mm) Mk IX guns in single mounts. For anti-aircraft (AA) defence, Hereward had two quadruple Mark I mounts for the 0.5 inch Vickers Mk III machine gun. She was fitted with two above-water quadruple torpedo tube mounts for 21-inch torpedoes. One depth charge rail and two throwers were fitted; 20 depth charges were originally carried, but this increased to 35 shortly after the war began. Beginning in mid-1940, the ship's anti-aircraft armament was increased, although when exactly the modifications were made is not known. The rear set of torpedo tubes was replaced by a 12-pounder AA gun.

Service
The ship was laid down by the High Walker Yard of Vickers Armstrong at Newcastle-on-Tyne on 28 February 1935, launched on 10 March 1936 and completed on 9 December 1936. Excluding government-furnished equipment like the armament, the ship cost £249,591. She tested the twin-gun mounting intended for use on the  destroyers in January–March 1937 at Gibraltar. It was removed at the end of the trials and her two forward guns were replaced immediately afterwards. The ship was then assigned to the 2nd Destroyer Flotilla of the Mediterranean Fleet and began patrolling Spanish waters in the Mediterranean enforcing the Non-Intervention Agreement during the Spanish Civil War. Hereward was refitted in Malta from 30 September to 30 October 1937 and again a year later, this time in Portsmouth Dockyard in June–July 1939 and she returned to the Mediterranean afterwards.

Hereward was transferred to Freetown to hunt for German commerce raiders in the South Atlantic with Force K in October. They refueled in Rio de Janeiro, Brazil, before proceeding to the estuary of the River Plate in case the damaged German pocket battleship  attempted to escape from Montevideo, Uruguay, where she had taken refuge after losing the Battle of the River Plate. Hereward captured the German blockade runner Uhenfels on 5 November. The ship was based at Trinidad from 20 November to 23 January 1940 and blockaded the German merchant ship Arauca in Port Everglades, Florida, whilst based there. She escorted the battleship  to Halifax, but suffered weather damage en route that required three weeks for repairs. Hereward then escorted the light cruiser  to the UK as the latter carried the ashes of John Buchan, Governor General of Canada, home. She required further repairs at Portsmouth upon arrival and missed the Battles of Narvik in April.

Hereward escorted ships into Scheveningen, Netherlands on 11 May to evacuate British citizens after the Germans invaded the previous day. She evacuated Queen Wilhelmina and her family from the Netherlands on 13 May, and was transferred to the Mediterranean Fleet a few days later. The ship arrived at Alexandria on 24 May and began escorting convoys and larger ships of the fleet. Hereward participated in the Battle of Calabria in July 1940, where she was hit by splinters from a near-miss of the Italian battleship . The ship escorted a convoy during Operation Collar and then fired at retreating Italians in Cyrenaica after the Battle of Sidi Barrani. She escorted three of the convoy's ship to Gibraltar on 29 December.

Together with the destroyer  and the gunboat , Hereward landed commandos on the island of Kastelorizo as part of Operation Abstention, but they were overwhelmed by an Italian counter-attack. Only a few survivors were taken off two days later. The ship participated in the Battle of Cape Matapan in early March 1941 and the evacuation of Greece in April 1941. She sank a number of fishing boats transporting German troops to Crete on 21 May and helped evacuate the Allied garrison of Heraklion on 29 May carrying 450 troops on board. Later that day she was attacked by German Junkers Ju 87 "Stuka" dive bombers and hit by one bomb just in front of her forward funnel. She turned towards the nearby coast of Crete, but was sunk by further airstrikes off Cape Sideros. The bomb that sank the ship was dropped by a Ju 87 belonging to III./Sturzkampfgeschwader 2 (StG 2–Dive Bomber Wing 2). Four officers and 72 crewmen were killed, but the 89 survivors, along with the majority of the evacuees were rescued and taken prisoner by Italian MAS torpedo boats and the destroyer .

Notes

References  
 
 
 
 
 Weal, John. Junkers Ju 87 Stukageschwader of the Russian Front. Oxford: Osprey, 2008. .

 

G and H-class destroyers of the Royal Navy
Ships built on the River Tyne
1936 ships
World War II destroyers of the United Kingdom
World War II shipwrecks in the Mediterranean Sea
Maritime incidents in May 1941
Ships sunk by aircraft during the Battle of Crete
Ships sunk by German aircraft
Wilhelmina of the Netherlands
Ships built by Vickers Armstrong
Destroyers sunk by aircraft
Shipwrecks of Greece